Grešnica is a village in the municipality of Kičevo, North Macedonia. It used to be part of the former Zajas Municipality.

Demographics
As of the 2021 census, Grešnica had 789 residents with the following ethnic composition:
Albanians 764
Persons for whom data are taken from administrative sources 24
Others 1

According to the 2002 census, the village had a total of 1480 inhabitants. Ethnic groups in the village include:

Albanians 1475
Macedonians 2
Others 3

Sports
Local football club KF Xixa plays in the OFS Kičevo league.

References

External links

Villages in Kičevo Municipality
Albanian communities in North Macedonia